Shauna Linn Rohbock (born April 4, 1977) is a retired Olympic medal-winning bobsledder, former professional soccer player, and is a staff sergeant in the Utah Army National Guard. After retiring from competitions she worked as a bobsled coach at the Utah Olympic Park.

Early life
Rohbock was raised in Orem, Utah, and is a graduate of Orem's Mountain View High School and Brigham Young University, where she studied recreation management. She graduated from BYU with a Bachelor of Science in 1999. She is the middle child among seven siblings, and has five sisters and one brother. Rohbock is a member of the Church of Jesus Christ of Latter-day Saints.

While attending college, she set several BYU Cougars women's soccer records, scoring 95 goals in 368 shots during her 90-game career there. Her 95 goals places her sixth (as of 2006) on the NCAA career scoring list.

In 2000 she joined the Utah Army National Guard and became a member of the National Guard Outstanding Athlete Program.

Soccer career
At the professional level, she played for the San Diego Spirit of the Women's United Soccer Association in 2003.

Bobsleigh career
Rohbock  competed in the bobsled at the 2006 Winter Olympics in Turin, winning silver in the two-woman event with teammate Valerie Fleming. Rohbock's best overall finish in the Bobsleigh World Cup was second in 2006–2007 with Fleming. She won her first career World Cup win at the Calgary race, followed by a second win at the World Cup held at Park City, Utah on December 8, 2006. She delivered a 48.73 second run that shattered the Park City track record previously set by Jill Bakken in 2002. Rohbock and Fleming has also won bronze medals at the World Championships in 2005 and 2007. Rohbock has competed in bobsled since 1999. At the 2009 world championships in Lake Placid, New York, she won a silver medal in the two-woman event with Elana Meyers, then won a bronze in the mixed team event.

Rohbock was named to the US Olympic team for the 2010 Winter Olympics on January 16, 2010, where she finished sixth in the two-woman event.

She coached the Brazilian men's bobsled team at the 2018 Winter Olympics, a role she combined with a position as part of the coaching team for the United States squad.

In May 2018, President Donald Trump appointed Rohbock to be a member of his Council on Sports, Fitness & Nutrition.

Career highlights
Olympic Winter Games
2006 – Torino,  2nd with Valerie Fleming
World Championships
2005 – Calgary,  3rd with Valerie Fleming
2007 – St. Moritz,  3rd with Valerie Fleming
2009 – Lake Placid,  2nd with Elana Meyers
World Cup

2004/2005 – Altenberg,  3rd with Erin Pac
2004/2005 – Igls,  3rd with Valerie Fleming
2004/2005 – Cesana,  2nd with Valerie Fleming
2005/2006 – Calgary,  2nd with Valerie Fleming
2005/2006 – Lake Placid,  3rd with Valerie Fleming
2006/2006 – Igls,  3rd with Valerie Fleming
2006/2006 – Cortina d'Ampezzo,  3rd with Valerie Fleming
2006/2007 – Calgary,  1st with Valerie Fleming
2006/2007 – Park City,  1st with Valerie Fleming
2006/2007 – Lake Placid,  3rd with Valerie Fleming
2006/2007 – Igls,  2nd with Valerie Fleming
2006/2007 – Cesana,  2nd with Valerie Fleming
2006/2007 – Winterberg,  2nd with Valerie Fleming
2006/2007 – Königssee,  2nd with Valerie Fleming
2007/2008 – Park City,  3rd with Valerie Fleming
2007/2008 – Cesana,  2nd with Valerie Fleming
2007/2008 – Winterberg,  3rd with Valerie Fleming
2008/2009 – Altenberg,  3rd with Elana Meyers
2008/2009 – Igls,  2nd with Valerie Fleming
2008/2009 – Königssee,  1st with Valerie Fleming
2008/2009 – Whistler,  1st with Elana Meyers

Personal life
Rohbock is married to her former bobsleigh teammate Valerie Fleming, and has two children.

References

External links

16 January 2010 US Bobsled and Skeleton Federation announcement of the US Olympic women's bobsled team. – accessed January 18, 2010.
Bobsleigh two-woman Olympic medalists since 2002

WUSA player profile
BYU soccer profile
BYU track and field profile
WCAP profile
Health.gov profile

1977 births
Living people
American female bobsledders
BYU Cougars women's soccer players
American Latter Day Saints
Bobsledders at the 2006 Winter Olympics
Bobsledders at the 2010 Winter Olympics
Female United States Army personnel
Olympic silver medalists for the United States in bobsleigh
Sportspeople from Orem, Utah
San Diego Spirit players
Women's United Soccer Association players
Medalists at the 2006 Winter Olympics
American women's soccer players
Women's association football forwards
Sports coaches from Utah
United States Army non-commissioned officers
United States women's international soccer players
Utah National Guard personnel